Willemijn Bos (born 2 May 1988) is a Dutch field hockey defender. In 2011, she was included to the All-Star team by the International Hockey Federation. She was to be selected for the 2012 Summer Olympics but tore her anterior cruciate ligament during a friendly against the United States three days before the Games and had to withdraw. She returned to competitions in March 2013, and won a silver medal at the 2016 Rio Olympics.

Bos took up hockey aged six. She has a degree in law from the University of Utrecht.

References

External links

 

1988 births
Living people
Dutch female field hockey players
People from Tynaarlo
Medalists at the 2016 Summer Olympics
Olympic silver medalists for the Netherlands
Olympic medalists in field hockey
Field hockey players at the 2016 Summer Olympics
Olympic field hockey players of the Netherlands
Sportspeople from Drenthe
20th-century Dutch women
20th-century Dutch people
21st-century Dutch women